Cadillac Hotel may refer to:

Cadillac Hotel (Miami Beach, Florida)
Westin Book-Cadillac Hotel, Detroit, Michigan, a hotel